Geoffrey Haydon Manning (1926–2018) was an Australian author and historian, commonly known as Geoff Manning and cited as an author as Geoffrey H. Manning. He is known particularly for his books on South Australian placenames; Manning's Place Names of South Australia (1990) is particularly well-known and available online at the State Library of South Australia website. The final illustrated edition of this work was The Place Names Of Our Land: A South Australian Anthology (2009).

Early life 
Manning was born in Waikerie, South Australia, a son of carpenter Richard Baker Manning (1896–1936) and his wife Grace Maud Manning, née Hein (1901–).

Career and other life interests
He was employed by the Savings Bank of South Australia until his retirement in 1982.

He greatly admired Labor Prime Minister Ben Chifley, and saw himself as espousing generally left-wing views.

Local history
After retirement from the bank, Manning devoted himself fully to writing on local history. His works on South Australian placenames contain much information supplemental to, and correcting, the much earlier Nomenclature of South Australia (1908) by Rodney Cockburn (1877–1932) and What's in a Name, a revised edition by his journalist son Stewart Cockburn (1921–2009).
John Hill, then Minister for the Environment, launched the online version of Manning’s Data Base of South Australian History in September 2005 at the State Library of South Australia.

His large collection of significant articles from South Australian newspapers has been digitised by the State Library of South Australia as The Manning Index of South Australian History.

In 1997 he released The Grange Golf Club: A History of the First 70 Years, 1926–1996 about The Grange Golf Club of Adelaide.

Family, death and legacy
Manning married Gwen in September 1956; it was her second marriage and he thus became step-father to two daughters. Haydon R. Manning, political scientist of Flinders University, is his son.

Manning died in September 2018, leaving a legacy of invaluable historical work on South Australian history.

References

Notes

Select bibliography
Geoffrey H. Manning Hope Farm, Cradle of the McLaren Vale Wine Industry (1980) 
Geoffrey H. Manning Whisky Makes You Well (1983)  
Geoffrey H. Manning Hope Farm Chronicle (1984) 
Geoffrey H. Manning (ed.) Memoirs of Thomas Frost, 1825–1910 (1985)  
Geoffrey H. Manning The Tragic Shore (1988) 
Geoffrey H. Manning and Haydon R. Manning Worth Fighting For (1989)  on bank employees' unionism
Geoffrey H. Manning Manning's Place Names of South Australia, Adelaide, 1990
Geoffrey H. Manning 50 Years of Singing; A History of the Adelaide Harmony Choir (1996) 
Geoffrey H. Manning and Alison Painter The Grange Golf Club; A history of the First 70 Years, 1926–1996 (1997) 
Geoffrey H. Manning A Colonial Experience, 1838–1910 (2001) 3 Volumes set 
Geoffrey H. Manning Manning’s Place Names of South Australia From Aaron Creek to Zion Hill (c.2006 ) "Includes facsimile of Rodney Cockburn's 'Nomenclature of South Australia' [1908]." (CD-ROM)
Geoffrey H. Manning The Place Names Of Our Land: A South Australian Anthology (2009)

External links
 Geoff Manning's published histories, links to place names and his subject catalogue of 100 years of South Australian newspapers (1836–1936)

1926 births
2018 deaths
Australian historians
People from South Australia